NFG or nfg may refer to:

 New Found Glory, an American band
 National Fuel Gas (NYSE: NFG), a diversified energy company
 Marine Corps Air Station Camp Pendleton (FAA LID: NFG), a US Marine Corps airfield in California
 Ahwai language (ISO 639:nfg), of Nigeria
 Nationale Forschungs- und Gedenkstätten, former administrator of the Goethe-Nationalmuseum